The Spring Statement of the British Government, also known as the "mini-budget", is one of the two statements HM Treasury makes each year to Parliament upon publication of economic forecasts, the second taking place the previous year as the Autumn Budget. At 2016's autumn statement, it was announced the budget would move to the autumn, with a spring statement taking place the following year. Both usually involve speeches in the House of Commons by the Chancellor of the Exchequer. The Spring Statement for 2019 took place in March 2019. In 2020 the spring statement was upgraded to a full budget following cancellation of autumn 2019's budget. and additional statements were made in summer and autumn 2020. In 2021 the spring statement was also replaced by a full budget.

History
The duty to publish two annual economic forecasts was created by the Industry Act 1975, with the first such publication occurring in December 1976. The first Autumn Statement combined the announcement of this publication with any announced changes to national insurance contributions and the Government's announcement of its spending plans (and publication of the Red Book), both of which were also made at approximately the same time in the parliamentary year.

In 1993, Conservative Chancellor Kenneth Clarke combined the announcement of spending with the Budget, merging tax and spending announcements. Doing so moved the Budget to November. To fulfill the legal obligation to make two statements, Clarke began the practice of making a Summer Statement focusing on economic growth forecasts. Unlike the Autumn Statements preceding them and the Pre-Budget Reports that replaced them, Summer Statements took the form of debate on a motion "that this House welcomes the publication of the Government's latest economic forecast, which..." rather than as a statement to the House of Commons.

In 1997, Labour's new Chancellor, Gordon Brown, moved the Budget back to spring and replaced the second statement with the Pre-Budget Report (PBR). According to the "Code for Fiscal Stability", published by HM Treasury in November 1998, the PBR was intended to "encourage debate on the proposals under consideration for the Budget". The PBR included a report on progress since the Budget, an update on the state of the national economy and the Government's finances, and announcements of proposed new tax measures and consultation papers.

Conservative Chancellor George Osborne replaced the PBR and its policy announcements in 2010 with a new Autumn Statement focusing on economic growth and government finances as projected by the Office of Budget Responsibility (OBR). Osborne's 2015 statement on 25 November was a joint Autumn Statement and Spending Review, and included a new forecast by the OBR.

In 2016, Conservative Chancellor Philip Hammond announced his intention to end the Autumn Statement: instead of a Budget in the Spring, and an Autumn Statement, there will instead be a Budget in the Autumn, and a Spring Statement, with the first on 13 March 2018.

List of statements

Previous statements
The statement has been held in the past during different seasons and with alternate names:
Autumn Statement (1976–1992, 2010–2016)
Summer Statement (1993–1996, 2020)
Pre-Budget Report (1997–2009)
Winter Economy Plan (2020)

References

External links
Pre-Budget Reports, 1997 to date at HM Treasury
Pre-Budget Report coverage by the Daily Telegraph
Pre-Budget Commentary by the Institute for Fiscal Studies

Fiscal policy
Debates in the House of Commons of the United Kingdom
Government of the United Kingdom
United Kingdom budgets
Annual events in the United Kingdom
Recurring events established in 1976